This article summarizes the outcomes of all official matches played by the Jamaica national football team by opponent and by decade, since they first played in official competitions in 1925.

All-time results

The following table shows Jamaica's all-time international record, correct as of 17 May 2022.

Results

2009

2010

2011

2012

2013

2014

2015

2016

2017

2018

2019

2020

2021

2022

2023

External links 

Jamaica at FIFA
Jamaica at CONCACAF

References
General

Citations

Results